Šustr (feminine Šustrová) is a Czech surname, a Czechized form of the German surname Schuster. Notable people include:

 Andrej Šustr, Czech ice hockey player
 Martin Šustr, Czech footballer
 Vratislav Šustr, Czech cyclist

Czech-language surnames
Surnames of German origin
Occupational surnames